The 1949 Loyola Lions football team was an American football team that represented Loyola University of Los Angeles (now known as Loyola Marymount University) as an independent during the 1949 college football season. In their first season under head coach Jordan Olivar, the Lions compiled a 6–4 record and outscored their opponents by a combined total of 230 to 226.

Schedule

References

Loyola
Loyola Lions football seasons
Loyola Lions football